Paul Vogler (8 March 1853, Paris - 17 December 1904, Verneuil-sur-Seine) was a French painter in the Impressionist style, known mostly for his landscapes.

Biography 
He was initially self-taught and did decorative work. Later, he was able to polish his technique when Alfred Sisley met him, became his mentor, and had a major influence on his style. He mostly painted landscapes in Le Midi, Brittany, Oise and the rural areas around Paris, at different seasons and times of day, to capture variations in the effects of light.

Thanks to his advice and urgings, Le Barc de Boutteville, dealers in classic art, became interested in contemporary painters and began offering their works in 1891. In 1893, commissioned by the poet, he painted the sets for Pelléas et Mélisande by Maurice Maeterlinck, in a production by Lugné-Poe In 1899, he had his largest exhibit at the gallery of Ambroise Vollard.

Despite his success, he was apparently rather profligate and died in poverty.

One of his works, "Alley Near a Small Town", was mistakenly attributed to Sisley because of a forged signature. The original signature was discovered in 2016, during a restoration at the Kunsthalle Bremen. The painting had been in the possession of Pastor Johann Friedrich Lahmann (1858-1937) and was donated to the museum when he died. Suspicion was aroused when it was noted that the painting was not listed in Sisley's catalogue raisonné.

References

Further reading 
 Christophe Duvivier, Les Peintres de l'Oise, Pontoise, Musée Tavet-Delacour, 2007

External links 

 More works by Vogler @ ArtNet

1853 births
1904 deaths
19th-century French painters
French landscape painters
French Impressionist painters
20th-century French painters
Painters from Paris